Mom is an American television sitcom created by Chuck Lorre, Eddie Gorodetsky and Gemma Baker that aired on CBS from September 23, 2013, to May 13, 2021, lasting eight seasons. Set in Napa, California, it follows dysfunctional mother/daughter duo Bonnie and Christy Plunkett, who, after having been estranged for years while both struggled with addiction, attempt to pull their lives and their relationship together by trying to stay sober and attending Alcoholics Anonymous. It stars Anna Faris and Allison Janney in the leading roles, with Mimi Kennedy, Jaime Pressly, Beth Hall, William Fichtner, Sadie Calvano, Blake Garrett Rosenthal, Matt Jones, French Stewart, and Kristen Johnston in supporting roles.

Filmed before a live audience, the series was produced by Chuck Lorre Productions and Warner Bros. Television. It received acclaim from critics and audiences throughout its run, with major credit given to its writing and performances (with Janney's noted in particular). It has been applauded for addressing real-life issues such as alcoholism, drug addiction, teen pregnancy, addictive gambling, homelessness, relapse, cancer, death, erectile dysfunction, domestic violence, overdose, palsy, rape, obesity, stroke, ADHD, and miscarriage, and for maintaining a deft balance between the humorous and darker aspects of these issues.

Mom consistently received high ratings in its genre, with an average viewership of 11.79 million, which made it the third-highest rated comedy on broadcast television in the US, as among the top five comedies with adults aged 25–54 and adults aged 18–49. It received various accolades, with Janney winning two straight Primetime Emmy Awards for Outstanding Supporting Actress in a Comedy Series in 2014 and 2015, and being nominated in 2016 and for Outstanding Lead Actress in a Comedy Series in 2017, 2018, and 2021. It also garnered multiple nominations at the Critics' Choice Television Awards and the People's Choice Awards. On September 4, 2020, Faris announced her exit from the series, and shortly thereafter CBS announced that it would end after its eighth season. The series finale aired on May 13, 2021.

Synopsis

Mom follows Christy Plunkett (Anna Faris), a single mother who, after battling alcoholism and drug abuse, decides to restart her life in Napa, California, working as a waitress and attending Alcoholics Anonymous meetings. Her mother, Bonnie Plunkett, (Allison Janney) is also a recovering addict. Christy's daughter, Violet (Sadie Calvano), who was born when Christy was 17, has also become a teen mother by her boyfriend, Luke (Spencer Daniels). Christy also has a young son, Roscoe (Blake Garrett Rosenthal) by her ex-husband Baxter (Matt Jones), a deadbeat but likable pothead.

Christy eventually returns to school and pursues her dream of becoming a lawyer, while Bonnie develops a romantic relationship with a retired stuntman named Adam Janikowski (William Fichtner), whom she eventually marries. Through it all, Christy and Bonnie rely on their support system from AA, including the wise Marjorie (Mimi Kennedy), wealthy and materialistic Jill (Jaime Pressly), submissive and sometimes overly-emotional Wendy (Beth Hall), and loudmouthed but sweet Tammy (Kristen Johnston). Collectively, they help each other stay sober in the face of the conflicts they face.

Following the departure of Christy, who moves to Washington, the show delves more into the personal lives of her friends she left behind.

Episodes

Cast and characters

Main
 Anna Faris as Christy Jolene Plunkett (seasons 1–7): an easily wounded single mother who has gone seven months without drinking and is still struggling with sobriety and a concurrent addiction to gambling. Though initially appearing to have some determination, the character devolved into a more child-like and comedic foil to her mother Bonnie's antics. At the series outset, Christy is sober, as she strives to be a good example to her son Roscoe, and regain the trust of her daughter Violet, who is revealed to be pregnant herself in the episode “pilot”. In addition, she is trying to iron out the rough edges in her relationship with her mother Bonnie, whom she still struggles to forgive after a tumultuous childhood and long estrangement. Christy later finds out that her biological father, Alvin, ran out on Bonnie after she was discharged from the hospital on Christmas Eve after giving birth to Christy. She locates Alvin and finds out that he is a married father with two sons and runs an auto repair shop. Christy eventually develops a bond with Alvin, whom she introduces to her family, and comes to see him as the father she needs in her life. Like her mother, Christy also became a teenage mother when she got pregnant at age 16 and had Violet at 17. Violet's father Butch was horribly physically abusive to Christy, who tried to leave him on numerous occasions, only to get cold feet. Christy finally worked up the courage to leave him in order to protect Violet. A former stripper, Christy is mostly seen working as a waitress. She is briefly promoted to manager (after Claudia divorces Gabriel), but eventually goes back to being a waitress, where she is not very good at her job, but does bring home a lot of food for Bonnie and herself. Christy later decides that she wants to go back to school to become a lawyer, and she takes a second job as Steve Casper's assistant, eventually earning her bachelor's degree and then being accepted to law school. Near the end of season 6, Christy begins an internship with a law firm, while still working her waitress job. In Season 7, Christy has unpleasant experiences at work, is not doing very well at law school (she was rejected for a mock trial team, and a professor she runs into while babysitting Marjorie's granddaughter presumes that Christy is a poor student because she's a single mother), has no social life to speak of, confirms she has little or no contact with either of her children, and out of desperation kisses another woman in the season finale. In the season 8 premiere, it is revealed that Christy has left Napa to attend Georgetown law school on a full scholarship; while Christy was mentioned during the 8th and final season, she never returned for a guest appearance and was not involved in the series finale in any way.
 Allison Janney as Bonnie Plunkett: Christy's self-centered mother, a  cynical recovering addict who is sure she's always right, but in the long run, learns humility. She tries to regain the love and trust of her daughter, whom she was unable to properly nurture as a child. Bonnie was given up for adoption at age four and was in the foster care system, being passed around from house to house where she eventually ran off with Alvin at age 15. She ended up pregnant and had Christy at age 17. Alvin abandoned both of them at the hospital on Christmas Eve. Bonnie said that she almost aborted the pregnancy, and then wanted to put Christy up for adoption. A pleasant Jewish couple was going to adopt her, but Bonnie couldn't go through with the adoption. From that point on, she tried her best to raise Christy. However, Christy wound up raising herself; Bonnie chose parties and drinking over staying home. With time and much therapy, Bonnie managed to find balance. She revealed Christy's past to her, including who and where her birth father was, as well as Bonnie's past "side career" as a drug dealer. She suffered a relapse in season 1 after losing her job and apartment, and had to move in with Christy, Violet, and Roscoe. After Christy reconnected with her biological father Alvin, Bonnie slowly realized that she still had feelings for him, and the two began to date at the beginning of season 2. This was cut short after Alvin suffered a heart attack and died, leaving his family shocked. After suffering from a back injury, Bonnie became hooked on pain medication prescribed to her, which led to another relapse. In season 3, she met her biological mother, and in season 4 she met her half-brother Ray after their mother died. She managed the apartment building where she and Christy lived. In season 6, she was diagnosed with ADHD and began seeing a therapist to deal with it. Late in season 8, she and former foster sister Tammy Diffendorf set up a construction firm together to market Tammy's skills in repair and home construction.
 Sadie Calvano as Violet Plunkett (main, seasons 1–3; recurring, season 4; guest, season 6): Christy's daughter and older half-sister of Roscoe. A senior in high school at the beginning of the series, Violet is hardworking, smart and sure of herself, though upset with her mother, who never had time to take care of her children and failed to fulfill a true motherly role despite now being sober for some time. After having her boyfriend Luke's baby, Violet made the decision to place her baby for adoption because she felt that this was the best way to break her family's repeated cycle of poor life choices and give her child a better chance than herself, her mother, or her grandmother ever had. Violet's father was physically abusive to Christy, and Christy has lied to Violet concerning his whereabouts, taking her to a random man's grave and telling Violet that her father is dead. During season 2, in a downward spiral of bad behavior, Violet cheats on Luke and he breaks up with her. She later gets engaged to Gregory Munchnik, a much older psychology professor at her university, but he breaks the engagement after she begins to party too hard, leaving her mother and grandmother wondering if she was just experiencing young life or developing a problem. Violet moves back in with Christy and Bonnie after her break up. When her mother and grandmother demand that she get a job, Violet moves to Lake Tahoe to become a blackjack dealer at Harrah's. Violet moves back to her mother and grandmother after wrecking her life in Lake Tahoe and gets back together and moves in with Luke after seeing that he has improved his life. In Calvano's last appearance on the show, Violet returns in Season 6 as the host of a successful podcast called "The Mother of all Problems" where she outlines in great detail all of Christy's terrible past actions; it is revealed that Christy and Violet have not talked in over a year (though she remains in contact with Bonnie), and while Violet lets Christy on her podcast and gives her credit for turning her life around, she bluntly says that the past cannot be changed and she thinks it is healthier to have no relationship with Christy in the future. In Season 7, Christy sadly confirms to Bonnie's new sponsee that she still does not have a relationship with Violet.
 Nate Corddry as Gabriel (main, seasons 1–2): the manager of the restaurant where Christy works. Married to a domineering woman who scares him somewhat, Gabriel and Christy are carrying on an affair which Christy later ends but which Gabriel himself frequently and desperately tries to renew: they briefly resume their affair in season 2 when Christy is promoted as his replacement. He is a hardworking, competent manager, but often put in his place by his subordinates, particularly Chef Rudy.
 Matt Jones as Baxter (main, seasons 1–3; recurring, seasons 4–6): Christy's ex-husband and the father of Roscoe. Sweet and charming, but very unstable, he is unable to maintain a serious relationship or steady work for much longer than a month. Loves easy life and frequently gets into fraudulent deals to make money. Despite his flaws, he is a loving father who usually comes through for his son. During season 2, under the influence of his wealthy new girlfriend Candace, Baxter mostly gives up his slacker ways and becomes a car salesman at a dealership owned by Candace's father. Despite admitting to Christy he needs to smoke pot to act happy, Baxter seems mostly content to be an ersatz "trophy husband". In season 5, Baxter pays for Christy's new car when she's dealing with money issues as his way of making some amends to Christy.
 French Stewart as Chef Rudy (main, seasons 1–2; recurring, seasons 3, 5–8): the head chef for the Rustic Fig restaurant, where Christy works as a waitress. A dominant and difficult self-made man, Rudy acts superior in his relationships with others. He sells drugs out of the freezer and is boastful and arrogant, often yelling at his subordinates without mincing words, and will not hesitate to humiliate anyone who opposes him. He is secretive about his past and distant from people, but briefly dates Bonnie and is revealed to be a bisexual fetishist with expensive tastes and hobbies who steals food from the restaurant (which has resulted in him being fired as of season 8, leaving him to run his own food truck). Tammy is his most recent love interest but they are no longer involved by the time the series ends.
 Spencer Daniels as Luke (main, season 1; recurring season 2; guest, season 4): a young student who loves to enjoy life and adventure. He had been dating Violet for a little over a year and got her pregnant. Luke is considerably airheaded, smoking marijuana often, but always tries to prove to Christy that he is not as crazy as he appears: he seems to genuinely love Violet, staying beside her and supporting her throughout her pregnancy, and he is often more sensitive towards Christy than her own children are, perhaps because his parents are religious fundamentalists with whom he does not connect. In season 2, Violet, during her downward spiral, cheated on Luke and he broke up with Violet. By season 4, Luke has apparently cleaned himself up and got a high-paying job with a video game company, driving Violet to get back together with him. Violet reveals in season 6 that she and Luke have ended their relationship.
 Blake Garrett Rosenthal as Roscoe Plunkett (main, seasons 1–3; recurring, season 4): Christy's son by Baxter and half-brother of Violet. He experimented with marijuana at age twelve. He has not appeared since season 4, and it is stated he went to live with Baxter and his new wife Candace (which Christy confirms in season 7). However, in "Beef Baloney Dan and a Sarcastic No", it is heavily implied that Christy still has an on-going relationship with her son, as it is revealed that he still texts her.
 Mimi Kennedy as Marjorie Armstrong-Perugian (recurring, season 1; main, seasons 2–8): Christy's and Bonnie's AA sponsor who is something of a cat lady. She had problems with alcohol and drugs in the past, was a groupie (it is insinuated in one episode and attested by herself in others that she slept with Jimi Hendrix), was briefly involved with the Black Panther Party, spent some time in prison for bank robbery, was homeless for a period of time, and is a mother to a son whom she had no relationship or contact with for years, until Christy convinced him to reconnect with Marjorie following her cancer diagnosis. She was diagnosed with breast cancer in season 1, and after extensive treatment finally beats it at the end of season 2. Through Christy she meets Victor Perugian, Christy's former landlord, whom she eventually weds and then cares for after he suffers a stroke. When Victor dies, her vulnerable side is revealed, and the women do their best to help Marjorie cope with being widowed for the second time (her first husband having died before the start of the show, after three decades of marriage). Marjorie has dealt with financial and health issues in Seasons 7 and 8, including her having to take a food delivery job to earn money and having to have a stent put into her heart to prevent its failure.
 Jaime Pressly as Jill Kendall (recurring, season 2; main, seasons 3–8): A wealthy, divorced socialite and alcoholic. Christy first met her at an AA meeting and, at Marjorie's urging, offered to sponsor her. Jill suffered several relapses before becoming sober. Her mother had struggled with depression and alcoholism before dying by suicide when Jill was a teenager. Jill carried this pain with her throughout her life, culminating in season 4, when she was overcome with grief on the anniversary of her mother's death. Jill is from North Carolina, and worked hard to lose the thickness of her Southern accent upon moving to California to be with her then-husband, James. After trying to become pregnant and miscarrying, Jill decides to adopt a foster child. She is eventually given a teenage girl named Emily, but Christy helps Emily's mother become sober at the start of season 5, leading to Emily leaving Jill. This caused Jill to overeat and gain weight (scripted to cover up Pressly's real-life pregnancy during season 5). After an extended stay at a health spa, she returns in the later half of season 5 and suffers another relapse. Despite being vain and obsessed with how her peers view her, she is shown to genuinely care about her friends and use her experiences to help them with their own problems. In season 6 she began a relationship with Andy, a police officer and former Marine who provided private home security services at Jill's home after it was broken into. At the end of season 7, Jill consults a fertility doctor to freeze her eggs but she gets a call from the doctor saying that she has no viable eggs, leaving her extremely devastated by that news: she becomes clingy and paranoid, eventually causing Andy to break up with her in season 8, although they get back together after being caught in a bank robbery. In the final episodes of the series, Jill becomes pregnant again and marries Andy.
 Beth Hall as Wendy Harris (recurring, season 2; main, seasons 3–8): A member of the AA group, often subdued and prone to constant crying. She is a member of Mensa, works as a registered nurse (displaying a hidden sadistic streak when in uniform), was raised by a lesbian couple in Florida, is implied to be in witness protection or otherwise connected to a mob family, and is the subject of a recurring joke in the series where no one, including her friends, listens much to her or wants her around more than minimally possible. In "A Pirate, Three Frogs, and a Prince", Wendy was revealed to be both bisexual/pansexual/bicurious, and possibly attracted to Bonnie. Wendy frequently moderates the group's AA meetings; she delivers the final line of the series, standing at the meeting podium and asking, "Who else wants to share?"
 William Fichtner as Adam Janikowski (recurring, season 3; main, seasons 4–8): Bonnie's later love interest and eventual husband, an ex-stuntman who now uses a wheelchair. He and Bonnie met over the phone after Adam called her several times, though hers was a wrong number given to him by a woman he'd met in a bar. Adam reveals in his first date with Bonnie that his spinal injury did not occur in the line of work, but was the result of sliding off a cliff while snowboarding. He is supportive of Bonnie's recovery, though does not always fully understand it, prompting him to eventually join Al-Anon. In season 6, he uses his life savings to open a bar called AJ's Barrelworks, and he and Bonnie get married in that season's finale. In the series finale, it is revealed that Adam has lung cancer, although it has been caught early and is therefore treatable.
 Kristen Johnston as Tammy Diffendorf (guest, season 5; recurring, season 6; main, seasons 7–8): an ex-con who was Bonnie's foster sister for a short time in their teens. They reconnect after Bonnie comes across Tammy while visiting a women's prison, where Tammy says she was tried and convicted of robbing a steakhouse on "Cops Eat Free Night", and Tammy joins the group's AA meetings upon being released from prison in season 6. After temporarily living in Bonnie and Christy's apartment, she moves in with Marjorie. When she returns to her old foster home where she lived with Bonnie, it is revealed that her father killed her mother and she went into the foster care system after that; in the Season 8 premiere, Tammy talks briefly on the phone to her father when he calls from prison to wish her a happy birthday. Tammy is extremely handy at home improvements and similar light construction work, and has helped Bonnie with her apartment manager work while also doing remodeling at Adam's bar and the restaurant where Christy worked. As of the end of season 7, she is working toward being a full-fledged contractor, and is no longer on parole after making excellent progress readjusting to society post-prison: by the end of season 8, she and Bonnie have set up a construction firm of their own.

Recurring
 Reggie de Leon as Paul (seasons 1–3, 5–8): Chef Rudy's silent and often submissive sous-chef, who was fired alongside him. They now run the food truck together.
 Kevin Pollak as Alvin Lester Biletnikoff (seasons 1–2, 8): Christy's father and Bonnie's ex-boyfriend who abandoned them when Christy was born. When Christy finds Alvin, he is running his own auto body shop and states he has a wife and two sons who know nothing of her existence. Despite that, he comes to love Christy and does what he can to be in her life and help out, including fixing up a used car to give her and attempting to reach out to her children as a grandfather. He and Bonnie initially treated each other with contempt and hatred over the various mistakes each of them has made in their past, but they rekindled their relationship after his wife left him and he survived a heart attack. In season 2, Alvin suffers a second, fatal heart attack while in bed with Bonnie.
 Octavia Spencer as Regina Tompkins (seasons 1–3): A fellow AA member and money manager who embezzled from her clients and faces a long prison sentence. While a close if questionable friend to Christy, Regina and Bonnie typically hold each other in contempt, but beneath the surface, they bear some affection for each other. In the middle of season 2, she is given early parole and becomes a born-again Christian, eventually moving in with Jill. Regina drifts apart from her friends after she decides she is no longer an alcoholic, essentially choosing wine over her friends, and struggles alone with the dissonance after moving into her own apartment and out of Jill's mansion.
 Courtney Henggeler as Claudia (seasons 1–3): Gabriel's wealthy and snobbish (later ex-) wife, who takes over the restaurant from him and briefly appoints Christy as manager.
 Mary Pat Gleason as Mary (seasons 1–5, 7): A fellow AA member who is frequently interrupted by Bonnie when she shares her problems with the group, as her anecdotes tend to be bizarre and creepy even by the standards of addicts. Mary dies in season 7 at the AA meeting from an aneurysm, (just months before Ms. Gleason passed away) and the main characters put together an elaborate reception to say goodbye to her.
 Don McManus as Steve Casper (seasons 1–4): A fellow AA member, Steve is a competent but creepy lawyer and occasionally aids Christy, who becomes his intern and trainee in season 2. He has a casual sex relationship with Bonnie in season 3. His final appearance was in the Season 4 finale, where he is stuck in Mexico because he stupidly fled there to avoid reprisals after losing a case involving a drug lord's son (stupidly since the drug lord is based in...Mexico).
 Ryan Cartwright and Melissa Tang as Jeff and Suzanne Taylor (seasons 1–2): the couple that adopts Violet's daughter.
 Sara Rue as Candace Hayes (seasons 2–4): Baxter's wealthy new wife, who reforms him. She delivers many subtle jabs at Christy's poverty in the form of backhanded compliments, and seems to be trying to force Christy aside to replace her as Roscoe's mother. The hostility becomes much more obvious in season 3, when Candace's wealthy father, Fred (Harry Hamlin), briefly dates Christy and Candace accuses Christy of only being with him for his money. Christy breaks up with Fred because he openly insults and mocks Candace for doing nothing but living off his wealth. When Candace (wrongly and smugly) smirks that Fred dumped her, Christy gives Candace a hug and shuts her up by saying "I know why you're a bitch."
 Jonny Coyne as Victor Perugian (seasons 2–4): Christy's Armenian former landlord who becomes attracted to Marjorie, marrying her in season 3. Victor later suffers two strokes (both offscreen). The first in Season 5 leaves him largely incapacitated, and the second in Season 6 is fatal.
 Amy Hill as Beverly Tarantino (seasons 2–5): A tenant in the apartment complex where Christy and Bonnie live (the complex itself was never given a name on the show). She dislikes Bonnie and is always trying to get her fired from the building manager position. However, she has been less harsh since she admitted to Bonnie that her own father was a hopeless alcoholic, and that she has projected some of her anger at him onto Bonnie due to her AA ties.
 Charlie Robinson as Mr. Munson (seasons 2–7): A blind tenant in the apartment complex where Christy and Bonnie live. He is a Vietnam war veteran who is battling prostate cancer. He and Bonnie develop a friendship; Bonnie reads to him, helps him with his medications and offers rides to chemotherapy. When the new building owner tells Bonnie to evict any tenant who is significantly behind in rent (including Munson, who is behind after paying out of pocket for cancer medications not covered by the V.A.) Bonnie revolts, telling the owner she'll quit if the owner doesn't back down. Her stand saves Munson's apartment and helps to cement their friendship.
 David Krumholtz as Gregory Munchnik (seasons 2–3): Violet's older Jewish ex-fiancé, a psychology professor at the college she attends.
 Emily Osment as Jodi Hubbard (season 3): A young drug addict whom Christy and Bonnie try to help get sober. She later dies from a drug overdose.
 Lauri Johnson as Beatrice (seasons 3–8): A waitress at the Burgundy Bistro that serves as a recurring location for the cast.
 Missi Pyle as Natasha (seasons 4–5): Emily's biological mother, an alcoholic whom Christy knows from her stripping days. Christy helps Natasha get sober and regain custody of her daughter.
 Julia Lester as Emily (seasons 4–5): Jill's teenage foster daughter and Natasha's biological daughter.
 Leonard Roberts as Ray Stabler (seasons 4–5): Bonnie's gay half-brother who was a successful lawyer and who developed a cocaine habit.
 Steven Weber as Patrick Janikowski (season 5), Adam's younger brother and Christy's short-term love interest. They break up after Christy turns down his proposal for her to move to Santa Cruz and live with him, and he marries another woman soon after.
 Yvette Nicole Brown as Nora Rogers (seasons 5–6): Christy's no-nonsense sponsor who works as a TV weather anchor and finds herself violating her established rules about not interacting with sponsees outside of AA with Christy. In the Season 6 finale, she tells a devastated Christy she is leaving California to take a job at a TV station in Minneapolis.
 Sam McMurray as Ned (season 6), one of the Gamblers Anonymous members where Christy attends meetings; he becomes her de facto sponsor.
 Susan Ruttan as Lucy (season 6), one of the Gamblers Anonymous members in Christy's group; she is good-hearted but constantly relapses and loses huge amounts of money.
 Will Sasso as Andy Pepper (seasons 6–8), Jill's on-and-off love interest and eventual husband, a police officer and former Marine. His last name wasn't given until the series finale, and came as a source of amusement because he is a Sergeant with the PD (making him Sgt. Pepper) and he has a brother who is a physician (which makes the brother Dr. Pepper).
 Rainn Wilson as Trevor Wells (seasons 6–8): Bonnie's therapist who helps her with her ADHD and has a completely awful personal life, due to a divorce and financial setbacks. Bonnie ends up becoming friends with him and in his last appearance on the show she helps Trevor avoid a reunion with his terrible ex-wife and start a relationship with a woman he had a crush on in high school.
 Chiquita Fuller as Taylor (seasons 6–8): another waitress at the Burgundy Bistro.

Notable guests
 Jon Cryer as Alan Harper and Lisa Joyner as his date (S01E01): customers at the Rustic Fig
 Justin Long as Adam Henchy (S01E03, S01E06, and S01E08): Christy's love interest
Nick Zano as David (Fireman) (S01E016 and S01E17): Christy's love interest, a handsome but hard-partying guy. While he and Christy are compatible sexually, he wants her to focus all attention on him, and she ultimately breaks up with him because she's neglecting her sobriety and friends & family. 
 Ed Asner as Jack Bumgartner (S02E05): a tenant in the apartment building where Bonnie and Christy reside.
 Beverly D'Angelo as Lorraine Biletnikoff (S02E09, S02E11 and S02E12): Alvin's ex-wife, who hates Bonnie (and indirectly, Christy, as Bonnie's daughter). She refuses to help the Plunketts after Alvin dies without signing his updated will, but her sons end up defying her to give Christy and Bonnie a lot of money because "it was what Dad wanted." 
 Colin Hanks as Andy Dreeson (S02E09): Christy's neighbor whose idea of a fun night is not exactly what she expected
 Toby Huss as Bill (S02E13): Bonnie's love interest after the death of Alvin. She tries too hard to make him into Alvin 2.0, but her changes end up enabling Bill to win over a pretty waitress at a Hooters-type restaurant.
 Ellen Burstyn as Shirley Stabler (S03E01): Bonnie's biological mother who put her in foster care when she was very young, and later decided not to regain custody because she was dating a man who did not want any kids in his house. She's left weeping when Bonnie tells that she both forgives her and will not have a relationship going forward. The character died in Season 4 after suffering from heart disease. 
 June Squibb as Dottie (S03E01): a woman who Christy initially mistakes for Shirley, and later bonds with the Plunketts as a sort of modern family grandmother figure. 
 Judy Greer as Michelle (S03E03): a woman who is drunk at a bar when Christy and Bonnie meet in a bar and wrongly think she's an alcoholic they can help. In reality, she got drunk over a lost promotion and an affair, and the intervention leads her to get a restraining order against both Plunketts.
 Linda Lavin as Phyllis Munchnik (S03E07 and S03E21): Gregory's mother and Violet's would-be Jewish mother-in-law, whom Christy ends up becoming friends with.
 Harry Hamlin as Fred Hayes (S03E08 and S03E09): Candace's wealthy father and Christy's brief love interest.
 Rosie O'Donnell as Jeanine (S03E10 and S04E02): an ex-girlfriend of Bonnie whom she and Christy lived with. She and Christy maintain an aunt-niece relationship.
 Joe Manganiello as Julian (S03E11): a handsome but very sad newcomer to Alcoholics Anonymous whom Christy takes under her wing and (narrowly) avoids sleeping with.
 Rhea Perlman as Anya Perugian (S03E12): Marjorie's Armenian sister-in-law and Victor's sister, who is a bitter, unlikable woman who nearly derails Victor and Marjorie's wedding plans.
 Richard Schiff as Robert (S03E20): Bonnie's Communications Director in a White House dream that she had
 Bradley Whitford as Mitch (S04E09 and S06E13): Adam's friend who is a Hollywood director with a fondness for alcohol and trying to seduce Bonnie in ways that often get him punched or otherwise injured.
 Nicole Sullivan as Leanne (S04E09 and S06E13): Mitch's hard-drinking wife who was once involved with Adam.
 Chris Pratt as Nick Banaszak (S04E11): Marjorie's nephew, a charming horse-riding instructor whom Christy has sex with, despite Marjorie declaring him off-limits. He turns out to be goofy and Marjorie reveals, to Christy's horror, that he has mental problems and mostly lives in an institution.
 Wendie Malick as Danielle Janikowski (S04E15 and S04E16): Adam's ex-wife whose friendly relationship with him confounds Bonnie.
 Michael Angarano as Cooper (S05E03 and S05E10): Christy's younger classmate at college and romantic interest
 Kristin Chenoweth as Miranda (S05E14): Jill's inner strength advisor who met her at the latter's weight loss retreat
 Patti LuPone as Rita Gennaro (S05E19): the demanding owner of the building that is managed by Bonnie. She's initially curt and makes harsh demands of Bonnie, but becomes nicer when Bonnie stands up to her and reveals her own sad story. 
 Constance Zimmer as Natalie Stevens (S06E03): Christy's rigid professor at the law school who is also an alcoholic.
 Lois Smith as Claire Dickinson (S06E20): Bonnie and Tammy's former caretaker at the old foster home
 Kate Micucci as Patty (S07E01 and S07E10): A single mother who is a member of the AA meeting Bonnie attends while on her honeymoon with Adam. Bonnie agrees to become Patty's sponsor.
 Reginald Veljohnson as Jim (S07E01): A member of the AA meeting Bonnie attends while on her honeymoon with Adam
 John Ratzenberger as Stan (S07E01): A member of the AA meeting Bonnie attends while on her honeymoon with Adam. He has a tendency to ramble.
 Paget Brewster as Veronica Stone (S07E03, S07E05 and S07E06): Christy's demanding and not that stable new boss at a law firm. She yells at Christy a lot and makes ridiculous demands, but also serves as an oddly effective and intelligent mentor to her.
 Kathleen Turner as Cookie (S07E11 and S07E14): Tammy's long-lost aunt who comes back into her life; it's revealed that not only did Cookie lie about not knowing Tammy existed and let Tammy go into the foster system rather than take her in as a child, but also that the only reason she sought out Tammy now is to get her to agree to a life-saving kidney transplant.
 Peter Onorati as Wayne (S07E15): Marjorie's first post-widowing love interest from Canada.
 Courtney Thorne-Smith as Sam (S07E17): Adam's Al-Anon sponsor. Bonnie suspects, correctly, that she is attracted to Adam.
 Kevin Dunn as Gary (S08E02): Marjorie's annoying newer love interest from Chicago.
 Steve Valentine as Rod Knaughton (S08E03, S08E11 and S08E12): An almost-famous rocker, now a recovering addict, whom Bonnie spent a few nights with in the 1980s.
 Tyne Daly as Barbara (S08E09): Trevor's therapist. She bluntly tells him he cannot date Jill, and he reluctantly agrees with her.
 Bob Odenkirk as Hank (S08E12): A strip club owner who put up a huge billboard that features an R-rated, 20-year old picture of Christy, and refuses to take it down because it's great for business (the women end up just painting over it on their own). 
 Dan Bucatinsky as Arthur (S08E15): Bonnie and Tammy's first client for their PlunkenDorf Construction business.
 Melanie Lynskey as Shannon (S08E18): A new and reluctant member of Bonnie's AA group.
 Rondi Reed as Jolene (S08E18): Shannon's mother, a severe and abusive addict.

Production

Development

Mom was one of the many projects that became a priority for CBS and Warner Bros when it was pitched in December 2012, in part due to Lorre's new four-year deal with Warner the previous September. It was green-lit by CBS for a series order pickup on May 9, 2013. It gave Lorre the distinction of having four sitcoms on one network starting in the 2013–14 season. The following week, the network announced it would place the show in the Monday night 9:30 pm (ET/PT) time slot following 2 Broke Girls. However, after the cancelation of We Are Men, 2 Broke Girls was moved into the show's 8:30 pm slot, with repeats of The Big Bang Theory occupying the 9 pm lead-in time slot to Mom until the season debut of Mike & Molly on November 4, 2013. Mom received a full first season order for 22 episodes on October 18, 2013.

On March 13, 2014, CBS announced the second season renewal of Mom. It moved from Mondays at 9:30 PM to Thursdays at 8:30 PM for the first 14 episodes, until it moved to Thursdays at 9:30 PM following The Odd Couple series premiere and the series finale of Two and a Half Men.

By season three, the focus became more about Christy and Bonnie and their group from AA, while the restaurant set, the kids, and Baxter's roles were reduced significantly.

In February 2021, CBS announced the series would end with the final episode of the eighth season, airing on May 13, 2021.

Casting
The series gave Faris, who had guest-starred in various television programs between her film projects and been sought for other television projects (including an unused pilot, Blue Skies, produced for NBC), her first full-time television role as the lead character, Christy, in January 2013. On January 28, 2013, Janney was next to come aboard as Christy's mother. Matt Jones and Spencer Daniels joined the cast in February 2013, with Jones as Christy's ex-husband Baxter, and Daniels as Luke, the boyfriend of Christy's daughter, Violet.

Broadcast
In Australia, Mom debuted on Nine Network on April 9, 2014. In Canada, Citytv aired it simultaneously. In Greece, Star Channel debuted it on October 25, 2014. In India, Comedy Central (India) broadcast the series through 2015. In Israel, it is broadcast on HOT Comedy Central. In the United Kingdom, ITV2 debuted the show on January 20, 2014; they have since dropped it, and it had not been available to UK viewers since the end of Season 4. From October 2022, all 8 seasons were made available to UK viewers for the first time on Amazon Prime Video.

Syndication
Mom went into syndication in late 2017. It airs on local affiliates, as well as on FX, TV Land, Paramount Network, Nick at Nite, and CMT.

Reception

Ratings

Critical response

Mom has been met with widespread critical acclaim, with praise for its writing and performances, especially by Allison Janney and Anna Faris. It received a Metacritic score of 65 out of 100 for its first season, based on 25 reviews, indicating "generally favorable reviews". On Rotten Tomatoes, the first season has an approval rating of 70%, based on 40 reviews, and an average rating of 5.71/10. The site's critical consensus reads: "Anna Faris and Allison Janney share an undeniable comedic chemistry, and if the jokes are sometimes too crass, Mom represents a sincere (and often witty) attempt to address addiction issues." Boston Herald critic Mark A. Perigard gave a positive review, writing: "This is dark material, yet Faris balances it with a genuine winsomeness, able to wring laughs out of the most innocuous lines." New York Magazine critic Matt Zoller Seitz praised the cast and called it "just about perfect".

The second season received even more critical acclaim, with a Metacritic score of 81 out of 100, indicating "universal acclaim". On Rotten Tomatoes, it holds an approval rating of 88%, based on 8 reviews, and an average rating of 8.5/10.

The third season was also met with critical acclaim, with a Metacritic score of 82 out of 100, indicating "universal acclaim". On Rotten Tomatoes, it holds an approval rating of 100%, based on 11 reviews, and an average rating of 8.33/11. The site's critical consensus reads: "Mom continues to nurture the multi-cam sitcom genre with mature storytelling and wonderful performances by Anna Faris and Allison Janney, who both handle reflective drama with the same deft touch as they do comedic timing".

Accolades

Notes

References

External links

 
 Vanity Cards Archive for Mom

2010s American sitcoms
2013 American television series debuts
2020s American sitcoms
2021 American television series endings
Alcohol abuse in television
CBS original programming
English-language television shows
 
Primetime Emmy Award-winning television series
Teenage pregnancy in television
Television Academy Honors winners
Television series about dysfunctional families
Television series about single parent families
Television series by Warner Bros. Television Studios
Television series created by Chuck Lorre
Television shows featuring audio description
Television shows set in Napa, California